Mazy Fly is the second studio album by American experimental pop musician Spellling, released in February 2019. It is her debut recording with Sacred Bones Records, making her labelmates with artists like Jenny Hval and Zola Jesus.

Composition
Kareem Ghezawi for The Quietus noted its songs as "experimental neo-soul", as well as comparing Spellling's avant-garde leanings to lauded musicians Björk, FKA twigs and Zola Jesus. He also called the record a “psychedelic circus of one". Tiny Mix Tapes noted its styles as experimental, R&B, and techno.

Critical reception

Mazy Fly was released to critical acclaim from music reviewers. On Metacritic, it has a score of 84/100, based on 10 reviews, indicating "universal acclaim".

Eric R. Denton for Paste called its songs "at once spacious and intimate" and the record as "remarkably cohesive".

Accolades

Track listing
All songs written by Spellling.

Personnel
Spellling
 Tia Cabral – vocals, Roland Juno-106

Additional musicians
 Divya Farias – violin, saxophone
 Andrea Genevieve – guitar 
 Janak Preston – percussion 
 Jacob Richards – percussion

References

2019 albums
Sacred Bones Records albums